Kathryn Bond Stockton is an American writer and academic. She works at the University of Utah, where she serves as the inaugural Dean of the School for Cultural and Social Transformation and a Distinguished Professor of English. Her primary research areas are "queer theory, theories of race and racialized gender, and twentieth-century literature and film."

Her books have twice been finalists for the Lambda Literary Award for LGBT Studies.

Personal life 
Stockton has stated that, though she was assigned female at birth, she often does not consider herself a woman, and if she were born in a different era, she may identify as transgender. In 2015, she had been in a "not lesbian" relationship with her girlfriend, who was also assigned female at birth, for 25 years. In this relationship, Stockton has referred to herself as "a gayish queer" and to her girlfriend as a "straightish queer."

Education 
In 1979,  Stockton received a Bachelor of Arts from the University of Connecticut, where she majored in psychology and minored in philosophy. Here, she joined Phi Beta Kappa.

She then received a Master of Divinity from Yale Divinity School in 1982, a Master of Arts from Brown University in 1984, and a Doctor of Philosophy from Brown University in 1989.

Career 
Stockton joined the faculty at the University of Utah in 1987 and became a Distinguished Professor in 2012, at which time she had been the program director for gender studies for a decade. In 2013, she was awarded the Rosenblatt Prize for Excellence, the University of Utah's highest award, presented to "a faculty member who displays excellence in teaching, research and administrative efforts." Since then, she as served as the Dean of the School for Cultural and Social Transformation and the inaugural Associate Vice President for Equity and Diversity.

Aside from her work at the University of Utah,  Stockton has served as a core faculty member at Cornell University’s School of Criticism and Theory (2011). She has also been a reviewer for the Danish Research Council, American Council of Learned Societies, and The Year’s Work in Critical and Cultural Theory, as well as an editorial board member for American Literature and Genders, and advisory board member for Critical Childhood & Youth Studies, Queer Studies in Media and Popular Culture, and West Virginia University Press.

Awards and honors

Self 
Aside from specific awards and honors,  Stockton has received fellowships from Wesleyan University, Brown University, and the University of Utah (1990, 1991, 1997, 2001, 2006, 2011, and 2012). She has also received various prizes from Brown University, Yale Divinity School, and the University of Connecticut.

Her teaching and scholarship has earned her numerous awards, including the University of Utah's Rosenblatt Prize for Excellent, Ramona W. Cannon Award for Teaching Excellence in the Humanities, the National Organization for Women's Lifetime Achievement Award and the Modern Language Association's Crompton-Noll Prize.

In 2015, she was honored with Equality Utah’s Allies Award.

Works

Publications

Book chapters and essays 

 "Being and Becoming Animal and Modern: Review of Atavistic Tendencies by Dana Seitler" in Criticism (2009)
 “LOST, or ‘Exit, Pursued by a Bear’: Causing Queer Children on Shakespeare's TV” in Shakesqueer, edited by Madhavi Menon (2010)
 “Jouissance, the Gash of Bliss” in Clinical Encounters: Psychoanalytic Practice and Queer Theory, edited by Noreen Giffney and Eve Watson (2010)
 “The Queerness of Race and Same-Sex Desire” in Cambridge Companion to Gay and Lesbian Writing, edited by Hugh Stevens (2011)
 “Rhythm: Secular Feelings, Religious Feelings” in Queer Times, Queer Becomings, edited by E. L. McCallum and Mikko Tuhkanen (2011)
 "Toeholds and Sticking Points: Review of Stephanie Harzewski, Chick Lit and Postfeminism" in NOVEL (2012)
 "Review of Robin Bernstein, Racial Innocence: Performing American Childhood from Slavery to Civil Rights" in Modern Drama (2012)
 "Tone on the Range: What to Make of Cruel Optimism?" in Social Text (2013)
 “We’ll Be Happy, When? Affects, Orgasms, Singles, and Objects in Queer Theory” in The Year’s Work in Critical and Cultural Theory (2014)
 "Reading as Kissing, Sex with Ideas: 'Lesbian' Barebacking?" in Los Angeles Review of Books Quarterly Journal (2015)
 “Monstrously Yours? Afterword” in Monstrous Children and Childish Monsters: Essays on Cinema's Holy Terrors, edited by Markus McFarland, P.J. Bohlmann and Sean Moreland (2015)
 “Is It in Your Body?” in Princeton Pocket Instructor on Literature, edited by William Gleason and Diana Fuss (2015)
 "If Queer Children Were a Video Game" in Queer Game Studies, edited by Ben Aslinger, Bonnie Ruberg, and Adrienne Shaw (2015)
 “Surfacing (in the Heat of Reading): Is It Like Kissing or Some Other Sex Act?” in J19 (The Journal of Nineteenth-Century Americanists) (2015)
 “The Child Now,” in GLQ: A Journal of Lesbian and Gay Studies, co-edited with Rebekah Sheldon and Julian Gill-Peterson (2016)
 "What is the Now, Even of Then?" in GLQ: A Journal of Lesbian and Gay Studies (2016)
 “The Queer Child Now and Its Paradoxical Global Effects” in GLQ: A Journal of Lesbian and Gay Studies (2016)
 "Where Is Queer? In the Neighborhood, the Gesture, the Drug, the Word?" in The Year's Work in Critical and Cultural Theory (2016)
 "On the Eve of Weather" Afterword to Reading Eve Kosofsky Sedgwick: Gender, Sexuality, Embodiment, edited by Lauren Berlant (2019)

Books edited 

 The Child Now (2016)

Books written 

 God Between Their Lips: Desire Between Women in Irigaray, Brontë, and Eliot (1994)
 Beautiful Bottom, Beautiful Shame: Where "Black" Meets "Queer" (2006)
 Queer Temporalities (2007)
 The Queer Child, or Growing Sideways in the Twentieth Century (2009)
 Making Out (2019)
 Gender (2021)

References 

Living people
University of Utah faculty
University of Connecticut alumni
Yale Divinity School alumni
Brown University alumni
University of Utah alumni
LGBT academics
Academics from Utah
Year of birth missing (living people)